Desheng Subdistrict is a subdistrict on the northern end of the Xicheng District, Beijing, China. As of 2020, it has a total population of 116,338.

This subdistrict was named after Deshengmen, a city gate on the now demolished Beijing city wall.

History

Administrative Division 
In 2021, the Desheng Subdistrict has the following communities:

Landmark 
 Deshengmen

See also
List of township-level divisions of Beijing

References 

Xicheng District
Neighbourhoods of Beijing
Subdistricts of Beijing